Cachar district is an administrative district in the state of Assam in India. After independence the undivided Cachar district was split into four districts in Assam: Dima Hasao district (formerly North Cachar Hills), Cachar district alongside Hailakandi and Karimganj.

Etymology
The Kacharis (Kachari kingdom) have given their name to the modern district Cachar. The Kacharis call themselves Barman in Barak valley and Dimasa in the Dima Hasao district. They were known to the Ahoms as Timisa, a corruption of the word "Dimasa". The Kacharis are allied to the Boro, Koches, Chutias, Lalungs (aka Tiwa) and Morans of the Brahmaputra valley and to the Garos and Tripuras of the southern hills. The Kacharis were perhaps the earliest inhabitants of the Brahmaputra valley and Barak valley. They are identical with the people called ‘Mech’ in Goalpara and North Bengal.

History

Pre-independence period
It was a part of Kachari kingdom.At Dimapur, Dimasa Kachari Princes Elder Drikpati & younger Dakhin had a conflict and the younger one along with his followers first built capital at Barak valley.Dakhin and his followers declared themselves as Dibrasa (Tiprasa) {Di-River, Brakro- Barak} which translates as children of Barak river.The region was originally a part of the Tripura Kingdom which was taken over by Koch King (presently known as Koch Rajbongshi, Rajbongshi) Chilarai in 1562. Chilarai gave the charge of the region to his brother Kamalnarayan. The descendants of Kamalnarayan ruled the region till 18th century. After the fall of Koch kingdom (due to no heir) the Dimasa Kingdom took over the charge of the region and ruled most of undivided Cachar district. The most powerful King of Kachari kingdom at Khaspur capital was Raja Shri KRISHNA CHANDRA DWAJA NARAYAN HASNU KACHARI.It is said that during His rule,Manipuri King sought his help against The Burmese Army . The Kachari King Krishna Chandra destroyed Burmese in the war and in lieu was offered Manipuri Princess Induprabha. As he was already married to Rani Chandraprabha, he asked the Princess be married to his younger brother Govinda Chandra Hasnu.The Last King of Cachar was Raja Govindrachandradwajanarayana Hasnu. During his period Khaspur was the Capital of Cachar (Kachar).
Cachar was another native kingdom that fell victim to the imperialist design of the British. The Kingdom of Cachar was being ruled by two rulers having clearly defined areas of control. In the plains (southern portion of Cachar) Govindrachandradwajanarayana Hasnu was the ruling prince. Tularam Thaosen was the ruling chief of the hilly tract (northern portion of Cachar or Dima Hasao). His territories were annexed after he died in 1854, and all of Cachar thuscame under the British occupation. While south Cachar was annexed under Robertson, the hilly tract of Cachar came under British occupation when Jenkins was the Commissioner of Assam. In 1916, it was the Commissioner of Pakokku Hill Tracts until 1947.

Geography
The Barak is the main river of the district and apart from that there are numerous small rivers which flow through Dima Hasao district, from Manipur. The district is mostly made up of plains, but there are a number of hills spread across the district. Cachar receives an average annual rainfall of more than 3,000 mm. The climate is Tropical wet with hot and wet summers and cool winters.

Economy
The district headquarters, Silchar, is one of the most important business centres of Assam.

In 2006, the Indian government named Cachar one of the country's 250 most backward districts out of a total of 640. It is one of the eleven districts in Assam currently receiving funds from the Backward Regions Grant Fund Programme (BRGF).

Administration

The district has three sub-divisions: Silchar, Lakhipur and Katigorah. There are seven Assembly constituencies in this district, viz. Silchar, Sonai, Dholai, Udharbond, Lakhipur, Barkhola and Katigorah Assembly constituency. Dholai is designated for scheduled castes. The seven constituencies make up the Silchar Lok Sabha constituency.

Transport

Silchar is one of the seven cities of Assam to have an airport, which is located at Kumbhirgram. It is served by regular flights from IndiGo, Air India and SpiceJet. The district is connected by broad-gauge railroads to Lumding in Assam and by road to the rest of the country. Regular bus and train services are also there with other cities in North-East India.

Demographics

Population
According to the 2011 census, Cachar district has a population of 1,736,617, roughly equal to the nation of The Gambia or the US state of Nebraska. This gives it a ranking of 278th in India out of a total of 640. Its population growth rate over the decade 2001-2011 was 20.17%.	Cachar	has a sex ratio of 	958	females for every 1000 males, and a literacy rate of 80.36%. Scheduled Castes and Scheduled Tribes make up 15.25% and 1.01% of the population respectively.

Religions 

There was a presence of Sikhism in Cachar after Guru Nanak's visit to eastern India in 1508 to spread the religion. Most of these Sikhs, in the early 18th century, were found in the northern part of Cachar where they used to work for the Assam Bengal Railway. Way back in 1971 Census, Hindus formed overwhelming majority in Cachar district, constituting 65.4% of the total population, while Muslims were 32.5% at that time.

Languages 

Bengali is the official language of the district and is spoken by 75% of the overall population, while English also served as 2nd additional official language of the district. Bengali Hindus and Bengali Muslims forms the overwhelming demographic majority of the population with significant number of indigenous tribals like (Meitei) Manipuri, Bishnupuriya Manipuri, Dimasa (kachari) and Rongmei-Naga. The immigrants from other parts of India constitute the rest of the micro-scopic make up. The main dialect of the region is Sylheti.

Flora and fauna

The vegetation is mostly Tropical evergreen and there are large tracts of Rainforests in the northern and southern parts of the district, which are home to Tiger, Asian elephants, hoolock gibbon, Gaur, etc. The forests of Cachar were once rich in wildlife but now vanishing due to human onslaught. Rare species found are Hoolock gibbon, Phayre's leaf monkey, Pig-tailed macaque, Stump-tailed macaque, Masked Finfoot, White-winged Wood Duck, etc., have been recorded. The Asian elephant is already extinct. The southern part was also recommended as 'Dhaleswari' wildlife sanctuary. Barail Wildlife Sanctuary is the only wildlife sanctuary of the district as well as the Barak valley region. It was initiated by noted naturalist Dr. Anwaruddin Choudhury in early 1980s. This sanctuary was ultimately notified in 2004.

Education
The district of Cachar has a number of well-known educational institutes in North East India. Silchar, the district headquarter, is a major learning hub of Assam. The district has a central university, the Assam University, which is situated at Dorgakuna, 18 km from Silchar. It also has NIT Silchar, one of the 30 NITs in India. The Silchar Medical College and Hospital is the only medical college of southern Assam.

College
The district also includes a number of degree colleges such as:

Cachar College
Gurucharan College
Radhamadhab College
Janata College, Kabuganj
Madhab Chandra Das College, Sonai
Women's College, Silchar
Jagannath Singh College, Udharbond

School
Schools in the district include:
Holy Cross HS School,Silchar
Jawahar Navodaya Vidyalaya, Pailapool
Silchar Collegiate School
Sonai Nitya Gopal Higher Secondary School
Don Bosco School, Silchar
Nena Mia Higher Secondary School

References

External links

 Cachar district official website

 
Districts of Assam
Minority Concentrated Districts in India